Namurotypus is an extinct genus of griffinfly with a single described species Namurotypus sippeli. It inhabited the large swamps of the Carboniferous period. Namaurotypus had a 15 cm long forewing and did not have secondary male sex organs as in modern dragonflies.

References

Meganisoptera
Carboniferous insects
Fossils of Germany
Fossil taxa described in 1989